The 2011 British Academy Scotland New Talent Awards were held on 24 March 2011 at the Glasgow Film Theatre.  Presented by BAFTA Scotland, the accolades honour the best upcoming talent in the field of film and television in Scotland. The Nominees were announced on 15 March 2011. The ceremony was hosted by Kaye Adams.

Winners and nominees

Winners are listed first and highlighted in boldface.

Special Award for Student Work
Lou McLoughlan - Caring For Calum

See also
2011 British Academy Scotland Awards

References

External links
BAFTA Scotland Home page

New Talent
British Academy Scotland
2011 in Scotland
2010s in Glasgow
BAF 
BAF
BAF
BAFTA
March 2011 events in the United Kingdom